Ronald Joseph Shurer II (December 7, 1978 – May 14, 2020) was a United States Army Special Forces staff sergeant and medic. As a senior medical sergeant during the Battle of Shok Valley in April 2008, he and his team were attacked by an enemy force of more than 200 fighters. Shurer fought for more than an hour to reach part of his unit, killing several insurgents along the way. He was initially awarded a Silver Star for this action, but in 2016 The Pentagon upgraded this recognition to a Medal of Honor. He received the latter honor in a White House ceremony on October 1, 2018.

Early life and education
Shurer was born in Fairbanks, Alaska on December 7, 1978, to parents both serving in the United States Air Force. Much of his childhood was spent in the Tacoma, Washington area where his father was stationed at McChord Air Force Base. Shurer graduated from Rogers High School in Puyallup, Washington in 1997, and Washington State University, where he received a bachelor's degree in business administration in 2001. At that point Shurer planned to enlist in the United States Marine Corps and was initially accepted into the Officer Candidate School but was later rejected when it was found he had pancreatitis caused by trauma from an earlier bicycle accident. Instead, he started working towards a master's degree at Washington State. He completed one year then enlisted in the United States Army from Spokane, Washington, in September 2002.

Military career

Shurer initially trained as an army medic and subsequently qualified to train as a Special Forces medic. This training included an internship in a hospital emergency room and completion of the national paramedic training program. He was promoted from sergeant to staff sergeant with the 3rd Special Forces Group on December 1, 2006. He was deployed with Combined Joint Special Operations Task Force in Afghanistan from November 2007 to May 2008 in Operation Enduring Freedom.

Battle of Shok Valley
 

On April 6, 2008, the team was participating in a joint US-Afghan raid designed to kill or capture Gulbuddin Hekmatyar, the leader of Hezb-e Islami Gulbuddin (HIG) in the Shok Valley of Nuristan Province of Afghanistan.

While moving through the valley, the team came under enemy machine gun, sniper and rocket-propelled grenade fire. The team suffered several casualties and became pinned down on a mountainside. To reach the first wounded soldier, who had received RPG shrapnel in his neck, Shurer ran through enemy fire. He continued up the mountain, returning fire for another hour and killing several insurgents to reach more wounded soldiers. He stabilized four more wounded soldiers and then received more enemy fire including a strike to his helmet and a wound to his arm. He then treated a soldier who lost a leg and continued aiding the injured and fighting the enemy for several more hours. He helped evacuate the wounded back down the mountain to a medevac helicopter, at times using his body as a shield against debris being dislodged from the cliff by the firefight.

The story of Shurer's actions that day are the subject of a chapter in the book No Way Out: A Story of Valor in the Mountains of Afghanistan.

Recognition

Shurer was initially awarded the Silver Star for his role in the operation. In 2016, the Pentagon conducted a review of all valor medals awarded since the 9/11 terror attacks and this resulted in Shurer's award being upgraded to the Medal of Honor. He received the award from President Donald Trump on October 1, 2018, in a ceremony at the White House.

Medal of Honor citation

Awards and decorations

Post-army

Shurer was honorably discharged in May 2009 and became a special agent in the Phoenix office of the United States Secret Service. He was later selected for the agency's Counter Assault Team and assigned to its Special Operations Division in Washington, D.C. He lived in Burke, Virginia, with his wife and two sons. Shurer was diagnosed with stage 4 lung cancer in 2017, and on May 14, 2020, he died as a result of the disease at the age of 41. Shurer was interred at Arlington National Cemetery on October 27, 2020.

References

External links

Silver Star Recipients Congressional Record, United States Senate, May 11, 2009

1978 births
2020 deaths
Military personnel from Fairbanks, Alaska
War in Afghanistan (2001–2021) recipients of the Medal of Honor
People from Puyallup, Washington
Military personnel from Tacoma, Washington
Members of the United States Army Special Forces
United States Army non-commissioned officers
United States Army personnel of the War in Afghanistan (2001–2021)
Washington State University alumni
United States Secret Service agents
United States Army Medal of Honor recipients
Deaths from lung cancer
Deaths from cancer in Washington, D.C.
Burials at Arlington National Cemetery